Steliyan Dobrev (born 12 November 2003) is a Bulgarian footballer who plays for CSKA 1948 as a midfielder.

Career
Dobrev made his first-team debut at 16 years old as a 73rd-minute substitute for Pedro Lagoa in a 1–1 home draw against Ludogorets Razgrad on 23 February 2020.

In June 2021, Dobrev moved from Slavia Sofia to CSKA 1948.

References

External links
 

2003 births
Living people
Bulgarian footballers
First Professional Football League (Bulgaria) players
SFC Etar Veliko Tarnovo players
Association football midfielders
People from Sevlievo